Susanna Josephine Lloyd (May 28, 1940 – September 30, 2020), credited professionally as Josie Lloyd, was an American actress. She was the daughter of Norman Lloyd and Peggy Lloyd, who was also an accomplished Broadway actress and director. Lloyd had roles on The Andy Griffith Show, including her 1962 and 1965 portrayals of the eccentric character Lydia Crosswaithe. Lloyd was the fourth wife of puppeteer Bil Baird. They were married in 1974 and remained together until Baird's death in 1987.

Career on television
As a teenager in Los Angeles, California, in the late 1950s, Josie Lloyd gained on-set experience in television production by observing her father's acting and directorial work on “Alfred Hitchcock Presents.”  On that series in 1959 she performed her first speaking role on television in the episode "Graduating Class," which was directed by Herschel Daugherty and involved her father as associate producer. Lloyd portrays Vera Carson.

The year after her role in "Graduating Class,” Lloyd had a brief uncredited performance as a girl at a New Year's Eve party in the film “Studs Lonigan.”  She then returned to television, where between 1960 and 1967 she worked on a variety of series. She had two additional roles on “Alfred Hitchcock Presents,” as well as multiple performances on “Dr. Kildare,” The Alfred Hitchcock Hour (1964 episode "Body in the Barn"), “The Farmer's Daughter,” and “The Andy Griffith Show.” 

Additional television series in which Lloyd can be seen in both dramatic and comedic roles include “This Man Dawson,” “Channing,” “Have Gun – Will Travel,” “The Twilight Zone” (1963 episode "The Old Man in the Cave,") “My Three Sons,” “Route 66,” “The Long Hot Summer,” and “Occasional Wife.”  Her last known television role was "Miss Efficiency" on “Occasional Wife” in 1967.

Lloyd's role as Lydia Crosswaithe
Josie Lloyd, between 1961 and 1965, appeared in four episodes of The Andy Griffith Show: on two occasions in 1961 in the role of Mayor Pike's daughter as both Josephine in “The Beauty Contest” and as Juanita in “Mayberry Goes Hollywood;” and in two other episodes in her most memorable role, the wallflowerish Lydia Crosswaithe. In 1962, she was cast for the first time as the odd, socially inept Lydia in "Barney Mends a Broken Heart.” Lloyd returned as the same character three years later in "Goober and the Art of Love,” which originally aired on February 1, 1965. In the 1962 episode, Lydia is a prospective date for Sheriff Andy Taylor arranged by his ever-meddlesome deputy, Barney Fife (Don Knotts), and Barney's girlfriend Thelma Lou (Betty Lynn). Lydia is again a social date in the noted 1965 episode, yet on this second occasion she is paired with the town's kind but bumbling gas-station attendant Goober Pyle (George Lindsey).

Death 
Lloyd died in Los Angeles on September 30, 2020, aged 80, she was survived by her father who died less than a year later in May 2021.

References

External links

 

1940 births
2020 deaths
20th-century American actresses
21st-century American actresses
Actresses from Los Angeles
Actresses from New York City
Jewish American actresses
21st-century American Jews